Drosera trinervia is a species in the carnivorous plant genus Drosera that is endemic to the Cape Provinces of South Africa. It was first described by Kurt Polycarp Joachim Sprengel in his 1820 work Neue Entdeckungen im ganzen Umfang der Pflanzenkunde.

See also 
List of Drosera species
Taxonomy of Drosera

References

External links 

 Obermeyer, A. A. 1970. Droseraceae. In L. E. Codd, B. De Winter, D. J. B. Killick, H. B. Rycroft [eds.], Flora of Southern Africa, vol. 13: 187–201. Department of Agricultural Technical Services, Pretoria.

trinervia
Carnivorous plants of Africa
Flora of the Cape Provinces
Plants described in 1820